Darren Baxter may refer to:

Darren Baxter (Australian footballer) (born 1965)
Darren Baxter (English footballer) (born 1981)